This is a list of museums in Bern, Switzerland.

Fine arts
Abegg Foundation (Abegg-Stiftung Riggisberg), Werner Abegg-Strasse 67, Riggisberg, . Historic textiles and fabrics.
Art Gallery Bern (Kunsthalle Bern), Helvetiaplatz 1, . Expositions of contemporary art.
Kornhausforum, Kornhausplatz 18, . Expositions of contemporary art.
Lichtspiel / Kinemathek Bern, Sandrainstrasse 3, . Cinema and movie history, projections of historic films. 
Museum of Fine Arts Berne (Kunstmuseum Bern), Hodlerstrasse 8–12, . Extensive collection of fine art from all periods.
Zentrum Paul Klee, Monument im Fruchtland 3, . Contains almost half of Paul Klee's paintings.
Museum Cerny. contemporary circumpolar art, Stadtbachstrasse 8a,  . Extensive collections of contemporary circumpolar art.

History
Historical Museum of Bern (Historisches Museum Bern) and Einstein Museum, Helvetiaplatz 5, . General history of Bern and exhibition on the life and work of Albert Einstein.
Salvation Army Museum, Headquarters of the Salvation Army, Laupenstrasse 5, . History of the Salvation Army.
Swiss Rifle Museum (Schweizer Schützenmuseum), Bernastrasse 5, . Swiss rifles and Swiss shooting sports history.

Science
Einstein House (Einsteinhaus), Kramgasse 49, . Home of Albert Einstein.
Museum of Communication Bern (Museum für Kommunikation), Helvetiastrasse 16, . History and technology of communication.
Natural History Museum (Naturhistorisches Museum der Burgergemeinde Bern), Bernastrasse 15, . Natural history.
Psychiatrie-Museum Bern, Waldau clinic, Bolligenstrasse 111, . History of psychiatry.

Other
Collection of Classical Antiquities (Antikensammlung Bern), Hallerstrasse 12, . Plaster casts of 230 classical sculptures.
Käfigturm – Political Forum of the Confederation, Marktgasse 67, . Exhibitions on political topics.
Swiss Alpine Museum (Schweizerisches Alpines Museum), Helvetiaplatz 4, . Nature and culture of the Swiss Alps.
Swiss Theater Collection, Schanzenstrasse 15, . History of theater.
 Tram-Museum Bern, Seftigenstrasse 48, . Vintage tramways and autobuses, opens only on some Sundays.
YB Museum in the Stade de Suisse, Papiermühlestrasse 77, . History of the BSC Young Boys football club.

References
 Museen Bern

 
Bern
Museums
Bern